Chonaq Bolagh may refer to:
 Chonaq Bolagh-e Olya
 Chonaq Bolagh-e Sofla